Peardale is an unincorporated community in Nevada County, California, United States, along State Route 174, southeast of Cedar Ridge, California and northwest of Chicago Park, California.

Peardale contains riparian, upland, and mixed conifer forest habitats.

Peardale is located on the Nevada County Narrow Gauge Railroad. The Peardale post office operated from 1916 to 1927.

References

External links
 Peardale Bird Sanctuary

Unincorporated communities in California
Unincorporated communities in Nevada County, California